The Liechtensteiner National Badminton Championships is a tournament organized to crown the best badminton players in Liechtenstein. They are held since 1986.

Past winners

References
Badminton Europe - Details of affiliated national organisations
Liechtensteiner Badmintonverband Yearbook

Badminton in Liechtenstein
National badminton championships
Recurring sporting events established in 1986
Sports competitions in Liechtenstein